Sulfurimonas autotrophica is a sulfur- and thiosulfate-oxidizing bacterium. It is mesophilic, and its cells are short rods, each being motile by means of a single polar flagellum. Its genome has been sequenced.

References

Further reading

Voordeckers, James Walter. Physiology and Molecular Ecology of Chemolithoautotrophic Nitrate Reducing Bacteria at Deep Sea Hydrothermal Vents. ProQuest, 2007.

External links

LPSN
Type strain of Sulfurimonas autotrophica at BacDive -  the Bacterial Diversity Metadatabase

Campylobacterota